Sheokjuk Oqutaq (1920–1982, Kinngait) was an Inuit sculptor.

Early life 
He was born in 1920. In the 1950s, he started carving with James Houston.

Career 
His carvings mostly depicted animals, including loons, narwhals, bears, and whales.

His disc number was E7-919.

From November 1988 to January 1989, his work was displayed in an exhibition called "The Sculpture of Sheokjuk Oqutag" at the McMichael Canadian Art Collection. His works are held in the permanent collections of several museums, including the National Gallery of Canada, the University of Lethbridge Art Collection, the National Museum of the American Indian, the McMichael Canadian Art Collection, and the University of Michigan Museum of Art.

References 

1920 births
1982 deaths
Inuit sculptors
20th-century Canadian sculptors
People from Kinngait
Artists from Nunavut
Canadian male artists
20th-century Canadian male artists